Candies or Candie's may refer to:
Candy, a confection that features sugar as a principal ingredient
Candies (group), a Japanese idol group
Candies (TV series), a Philippine television program
Candie's, a clothing brand
Candies Creek Ridge, a geological feature in Bradley County, Tennessee
Candie's Foundation, a non-profit organization to prevent teen pregnancy

See also
Candy (disambiguation)
List of candies